Euv or variation, may refer to:

 Extreme ultraviolet (EUV)
 Extreme ultraviolet lithography (EUV)
 Samdech Euv (1922–2012), King of Cambodia
 Samdech Euv High School
 Samdech Euv Autonomous Zone, a defunct secessionist movement
 Kaing Guek Euv (1942–2020), a Khmer Rouge leader
 Electric utility vehicle, a sport utility vehicle that is an electric vehicle
 Chevrolet Bolt EUV

See also

 
 
 Samdech Euv (disambiguation)